Shado or SHADO may refer to:

SHADO, a fictional organization (Supreme Headquarters, Alien Defence Organisation) in the Gerry Anderson UFO series
Shado (comics), a fictional female archer, an antagonist of DC Comics' Green Arrow
Shado Vao, a Jedi in the Star Wars universe

See also
Shadoe Stevens, the host of American Top 40
Shadow (disambiguation)